The Sechseläuten (Zürich German: Sächsilüüte, "The six o'clock ringing of the bells") is a traditional spring holiday in the Swiss city of Zürich celebrated in its current form, usually on the 3rd Monday of April, since the early 20th century.

Burning of the Böögg
Following the parade of the Zünfte (guilds), the climax of the holiday is the burning of Winter in effigy, in the form of the Böögg, a figure of a snowman prepared with explosives. The custom of burning a rag doll called Böögg predates the Sechseläuten. A Böögg (cognate to bogey) was originally a masked character doing mischief and frightening children during the carnival season.

History

The roots of the festival go back to medieval times when the first day of summer working hours was celebrated in the guildhalls across the city.  City ordinances strictly regulated the length of the working day in that era.  During the winter semester the workday in all workshops lasted as long as there was daylight, but during the summer semester (i.e. starting on Monday following vernal equinox) the law proclaimed that work must cease when the church bells tolled at six o'clock. Sechseläuten is a Swiss German word that literally translates into "The six o'clock ringing of the bells".  Changing to summer working hours traditionally was a joyous occasion because it marked the beginning of the season where people had some non-working daylight hours.

Burnings of Böögg figures (the Swiss German term for "bogey", in origin scary-looking ragdolls) in spring are attested in various places of the city from the late 18th and early 19th century, without direct connection to the Sechseläuten. The combination of the Sechseläuten parade and the burning of an official Böögg was introduced in 1902.

From 1902 until 1951, the holiday used to be held on the first Monday following vernal equinox. On that day, the Fraumünster bell, for the first time in the year, tolled to mark the end of working hours at 6 p.m. (historically the time of sunset on vernal equinox). 
The holiday was moved to the third Monday of April in 1952. Because of the later date, and because of summer time introduced in 1981, the lighting of the Böögg'''s pyre at 6 p.m. has now moved to several hours before nightfall. Additionally, because of its present date, the holiday is often within a week of 1 May, leading to a stark contrast between the upper class dominated Sechseläuten and the working class holiday of May Day. This proximity of the major festivals of two political poles of the society of Zürich has led to various interferences in the past, for example the abduction of the Böögg in 2006 by leftist "revolutionaries" a few days before the  Sechseläuten.  Since then, several Bööggs are held in reserve with the main one stored at a bank nearby the Sechseläutenplatz (the open area in front of the Opernhaus near Bellevue where most Zürich open air activities take place). Since 2010 the guilds of Zürich allow the women of Gesellschaft zu Fraumünster to practice Sechseläuten, usually just being guests of the guilds respectively the Constaffel society, but still not being as an official guild in Zürich.

In 2020 and 2021 the Sechseläuten parade was cancelled owing to COVID-19 pandemic; 2020 was the first time in almost 100 years that it had not taken place. It returned as normal on 25 April 2022.

Weather oracle
Popular tradition has it that the time between the lighting of the pyre and the explosion of the Böögg’s head is indicative of the coming summer: a quick explosion promises a warm, sunny summer, a drawn-out burning a cold and rainy one. The shortest time on record is 5:07 minutes in 1974 and the longest is 43:34 minutes in 2016. 

Sechseläuten in recent years
In 2007, the explosion of the Böögg’s head  took place 12:09 minutes after the pyre was lit, promising a medium warm summer.

In 2008, heavy rains soaked the Böögg and the wood pyre materials so much that firemen had to spray the pyre with kerosene or fuel oil after initial ignition in addition to 15 liters of fire accelerant which was initially thrown on the pyre. It took 26:01 minutes for the Bööggs'' head to explode which indicates a poor weather summer.The fact that the head, instead of traditionally exploding, burnt down very quietly caused a lot of confusion. After approximately 20 minutes the head had burnt away completely, but leaving a large piece of the neck hanging from the stake. It was the explosion of that piece that ended this year's event.

In 2012, it took 12 minutes and 07 seconds, and in this year there was some confusion if both firecrackers in the neck of the Böögg had exploded. It was determined that 12 min 07 secs was the mark.

In 2014, the head exploded quite quickly (7 Minutes and 23 seconds) but it ended up being a poor summer.

In 2015, the head exploded quite quickly and it ended up being a very good summer.

In 2016, the head exploded after 43 minutes and 34 seconds, setting a new record.

In 2017, the head exploded after 9 minutes and 56 seconds. A quick time and there was a good summer

In 2018, the head exploded after 20 minutes and 31 seconds.

In 2019, the head exploded after 17 minutes and 44 seconds.

In 2020, Sechseläuten was cancelled due to the COVID-19 pandemic.

In 2021, the head exploded after 12 minutes and 57 seconds. Sechseläuten was again cancelled but the Böög was still burned. To avoid crowds that could spread COVID-19 the Böögg was relocated to Schöllenen Gorge in the canton of Uri and burned outside Zurich for the first time in its history.

In 2022, the head exploded after 37 minutes and 59 seconds.

Additional events
Additional events of the holiday nowadays also include: 
A 'Kinderumzug' (children's parade) in historic and folkloristic costumes on the Sunday preceding the Sechseläuten.
A very colorful afternoon parade of the 26 guilds in their historic dress costumes, each with its own band, most with a sizable mounted 'Reitergruppe', and horse drawn floats, to the 'Sechseläutenplatz' at the lakeshore where the Böögg is burnt. 
A ceremonial galloping of the mounted units of the guilds around the bonfire.
Lunch and dinner banquets for the guildmembers and their guests.
The 'Auszug', the nighttime visits of delegations of each of the 26 guilds to several other guilds in their guildhalls to exchange greetings, toasts, witticisms and gifts.

Sechseläutenmarsch 
During this festival the popular march known as the Sechseläutenmarsch is played. It has no known composer but likely originated in Russia.

Gallery

Date 
With a few exceptions, the date is fixed to the third Monday in April.

Dates are:
16 April 2007
14 April 2008
16 April 2012
15 April 2013
28 April 2014
13 April 2015
18 April 2016
24 April 2017
16 April 2018
08 April 2019
20 April 2020
 19 April 2021
 25 April 2022

References

External links
 
  http://sechselaeuten.ch/

See also
 Zünfte of Zürich
 History of Zürich
 Burgbrennen (very similar custom in Luxembourg)
 Funkenfeuer (similar custom in Swabian-Alemannic area)
 Feuerrad (similar custom in Westphalia, Hesse, Bavaria, Switzerland)
 Hüttenbrennen (similar custom in the Eifel)
 Osterfeuer (similar German custom at Easter)
 Biikebrennen (similar custom in North Frisia)

Culture of Zürich
History of Zürich
Spring festivals
Festivals in Switzerland
Tourist attractions in Zürich
April observances
Holidays and observances by scheduling (nth weekday of the month)
Spring (season) events in Switzerland
Traditions involving fire

cs:Jízda králů